Lake Easton State Park is a  Washington state park in Kittitas County. The park sits in the eastern foothills of the Cascade Range and has  of shoreline on Lake Easton. Park activities include picnicking, camping, hiking, mountain biking, boating, fishing, swimming, cross-country skiing, snowmobiling, wildlife viewing, and horseshoes.

References

External links

Lake Easton State Park Washington State Parks and Recreation Commission
Lake Easton State Park Map Washington State Parks and Recreation Commission

State parks of Washington (state)
Parks in Kittitas County, Washington